Kathleen (Ida) Long CBE (7 July 189620 March 1968) was an English pianist and teacher.

Life and career
Long was born in Brentford, a suburb of London in the UK. She was a child prodigy who first performed in public at the age of eight at Aeolian Hall in 1915. From 1910 to 1916 she studied with Herbert Sharpe at the Royal College of Music in London. She herself was a teacher at the College from 1920 to 1964; her pupils included Imogen Holst and Eiluned Davies. She was a regular performer at the CEMA concerts during World War II, often with the violinist Eda Kersey. Others with whom she frequently appeared were Pablo Casals, Albert Sammons and Guilhermina Suggia, but her longest working partnership was with the violinist Antonio Brosa with whom she collaborated between 1948 and 1966. Her tours included Europe, North America and South Africa.

Long interpreted the music of among many others Mozart, Haydn and Bach, and in 1950 she was decorated by the French Government for her services to French music and in particular for playing and recording works by Gabriel Fauré, with whose music she was particularly identified. She was also created CBE for her "services to music" in 1957. Long was also a champion of new music, playing works of Madeleine Dring in concert sometimes before they had been published.

Kathleen Long made several recordings during the 1940s and 1950s, and Dutch composer Gerard Schurmann composed his Bagatelles (1945) for her, which she premièred at the Concertgebouw.

Her brother John Herbert Long was also a musician.

She was also the godmother to John Le Mesurier of Dad's Army fame.

Notes

References
 Feuchtwanger, Peter, article on record sleeve of Decca ACL 168 (1962)
 A Buyer's Guide to Historic Piano Recordings Reissued on Compact Discs: L-R: Kathleen Long (1896-1968) at the International Piano Archives at Maryland. Retrieved 31 Jul 2013.

1896 births
1968 deaths
British classical pianists
British women pianists
British music educators
Commanders of the Order of the British Empire
20th-century classical pianists
20th-century British musicians
Women music educators
20th-century women pianists